Dave Marshall or David Marshall may refer to:

 David Marshall (Canadian politician) (1846–1920), member of the Canadian Parliament for Elgin East
 David Marshall (Singaporean politician) (1908–1995), Chief Minister of Singapore
 David Marshall (British politician) (born 1941), British Labour Party Member of Parliament, 1979–2008
 Dave Marshall (baseball) (1943–2019), American Major League Baseball outfielder
 David Marshall (cricketer, born 1935) (1935–2019), English cricketer
 David Marshall (cricketer, born 1946) (born 1946), former English cricketer
 Dave Marshall (Barbadian cricketer) (born 1972), Barbadian cricketer
 David Marshall (Australian footballer) (born 1960), Adelaide and Glenelg footballer
 David Marshall (academic) (born 1968), professor of physical oceanography
 Dave Marshall (musician), guitarist with Vince Neil and Slaughter
 David A. Marshall (born 1978), American politician in Portland, Maine
 David Marshall (Scottish footballer) (born 1985), Scottish international footballer
 David Marshall (ice hockey) (born 1985), American professional ice hockey player
 David Marshall (Arizona politician), Arizona State Representative

See also

 David Marshall Grant (born 1955), American actor and playwright
 David Marshall Lang (1924–1991), British professor of Caucasian Studies
 David Marshall Mason (1865–1945), Scottish politician, banker and businessman
 David Marshall Williams (1900–1975), American firearm designer